Mahaoya is a town in the Ampara District, Eastern Province of Sri Lanka.

See also
Mahaoya Divisional Secretariat
Maduru Oya National Park

Reference 

Towns in Ampara District